Boumerdès (Kabyle: Tanebḍit n Bumerdas) is a province (wilaya) of northern Algeria, located in the Kabylia region, between Algiers and Tizi-Ouzou, with its capital at the coastal city of Boumerdès (formerly Rocher-Noir) just east of Algiers.

Administrative divisions

It is made up of 9 districts and 32 communes or municipalities.

Districts

 Baghlia
 Bordj Ménaïl
 Boudouaou
 Boumerdès
 Dellys
 Isser
 Khemis El Khechna
 Naciria
 Thénia

Communes

 Aafir
 Ammal
 Baghlia
 Ben Choud
 Beni Amrane
 Bordj Menaiel (Bordj Ménaïl)
 Boudouaou
 Boudouaou-El-Bahri
 Boumerdès
 Bouzegza Keddara
 Chabet el Ameur
 Corso
 Dellys
 Djinet
 El Kharrouba
 Hammedi
 Issers
 Keddara
 Khemis El-Khechna
 Larbatache
 Legata
 Naciria
 Ouled Aissa
 Ouled Hedadj
 Ouled Moussa
 Si-Mustapha
 Sidi Daoud
 Souk El-Had
 Taourga
 Thenia
 Tidjelabine
 Timezrit
 Zemmouri

Neighbourhoods
The neighbourhoods of Boumerdès Province are:

Villages
The villages of Boumerdès Province are:

Geology

Several mountain peaks are found in this province:
  (1032 m)
  (740 m)
  (630 m)
  (467 m)
  (452 m)
  (444 m)
  (430 m)
  (420 m)

Geography
The province is largely mountainous, with a long coastline and a number of rivers, notably the Isser, Meraldene and Sebaou. Its western edges have in effect become suburbs of Algiers as the capital has expanded.

History

The three towns of Zemmouri El Bahri (Rusubbicari), Djinet (Cissi), and Dellys (Rusucurium), all of Phoenician foundation, were the province's principal ancient sites, although smaller Roman towns existed inland, as at Thenia called , at Taourga; at none do any significant classical ruins remain. Zemmouri El Bahri (under the name of Marsa-d-Dajaj) and Dellys both attained some significance in the Islamic period, beginning with Hammadid times; the largely Ottoman-era casbah of Dellys remains an attraction. Boumerdès itself, called Rocher-Noir in the colonial period, was expanded substantially following the establishment of the new wilaya in 1984.

2003 earthquake

The province was very hard hit by the 2003 Boumerdès earthquake, whose epicentre was near Zemmouri.

Since the occurrence of the El Asnam earthquake on October 10, 1980, this province has not ceased to feel minor earthquakes.

The occurrence of weak tremors was further accentuated in the aftermath of the Chenoua earthquake of October 29, 1989.

From the earthquake of Wednesday May 21, 2003, telluric aftershocks lasted for years before stabilizing at low magnitudes.

Since 2003, the area encompassing this province has been classified as a high seismic risk region to make adequate technical provisions during the construction of houses and buildings.

The technical control of buildings in this province has become more rigorous and strict with regard to construction materials and construction.

The victims of this earthquake, who were housed in chalets and prefabricated houses, were still in 2020 in the process of being relocated to new apartments.

Resistance against French invasion

During the French conquest of Algeria, the region of the current Boumerdès Province in Lower Kabylia was the scene of several battles of  against French Troupes coloniales:

French invasion (1830–1870)

 First Battle of Boudouaou, which took place on May 25, 1837, as part of the Algerian resistance against French invasion.
 First Battle of the Issers, which took place on May 27, 1837, as part of the Algerian resistance against French invasion.
 First Assault of Dellys, which took place on May 28, 1837, as part of the Algerian resistance against French invasion.
 , which took place on April 18, 1840, as part of the Algerian resistance against French invasion.
 , which took place on September 18, 1840, as part of the Algerian resistance against French invasion.
 Second Assault of Dellys, which took place on May 12, 1844, as part of the Algerian resistance against French invasion.
 Battle of the Col des Beni Aïcha (1846), which took place on February 3, 1846, as part of the Algerian resistance against French invasion.

Mokrani Revolt (1871)

This region was the scene of the last battles of the Mokrani Revolt during the month of April 1871 at the gate of Algiers against the French invasion:

 , which took place on April 17, 1871, as part of the Mokrani Revolt.
 , which took place on April 18, 1871, as part of the Mokrani Revolt.
 , which took place on April 18, 1871, as part of the Mokrani Revolt.
 Battle of the Col des Beni Aïcha, which took place on April 19, 1871, as part of the Mokrani Revolt.
 Battle of Alma, which took place on April 19, 1871, as part of the Mokrani Revolt.

Independence Revolution (1954–1962)

This province saw the creation of several clandestine torture centers during the Algerian revolution: 
 Ferme Gauthier in Titouna within the commune of Souk El Had.
 Ferme Moll in the commune of Legata.
 Ferme Sabatier in the commune of Si Mustapha.
 Ferme Errol in the commune of Tidjelabine.
 Camp Bastos in the commune of Bordj Menaïel.
 Camp Cortès in the commune of Bordj Menaïel.
 Camp des Sénégalais in the commune of the Zemmouri.
 Camp Germain in the commune of Legata.
 Camp Gualota in the commune of Dellys.
 Camp Ouriacha in the commune of Naciria.
 Camp Stora in the commune of Kharrouba.

Resistance against Salafist terrorism

This province has suffered the horrors of dozens of terrorist attacks perpetrated by the Salafist Group for Preaching and Combat (GSPC):
 List of terrorist incidents in 2005
 2005 Tidjelabine bombing (July 29, 2005)
 List of terrorist incidents in 2006
 2006 Tidjelabine bombing (June 19, 2006)
 2006 Boudouaou bombing (August 8, 2006)
 List of terrorist incidents in 2007
 2007 Souk El Had bombing (February 13, 2007)
 2007 Dellys bombing (September 8, 2007)
 List of terrorist incidents in 2008
 2008 Naciria bombing (January 2, 2008)
 2008 Thénia bombing (January 29, 2008)
 2008 Beni Amrane bombings (June 9, 2008)
 2008 Zemmouri bombing (August 9, 2008)
 2008 Issers bombing (August 19, 2008)
 List of terrorist incidents in 2010
 2010 Tidjelabine bombing (April 7, 2010)
 2010 Ammal bombing (June 11, 2010)
 August 2010 Baghlia bombing (August 18, 2010)
 2010 Bordj Menaïel bombing (September 21, 2010)
 List of terrorist incidents in 2012
 2012 Thénia bombing (January 11, 2012)
 2012 Baghlia bombing (April 29, 2012)

Walis

Many Walis have passed through Boumerdès Province since its creation on February 4, 1984, through Executive Decree No. 84-09 that organizes the Algerian national territory within the framework of forty-eight wilayates.

Deputies

The deputies of this province during the legislative elections of May 4, 2017, are:
 Abdelkrim Djanati (Democratic National Rally)
 Ali Laskri (Socialist Forces Front)
 Belkacem Benamar (Socialist Forces Front)
 Hacene Bouzad (Independent)
 Mansour Abdelaziz (Movement of Society for Peace)
 Menouar Djaadi (National Liberation Front)
 Nadia Iheddadene born Amroune (Socialist Forces Front)
 Saliha Mekharef (Democratic National Rally)
 Salima Othmani (National Liberation Front)
 Yahia Mahsas (National Liberation Front)

Religion

Mosques

 Al-Fath Mosque
 Jabir ibn Hayyan Mosque
 Uthman ibn Affan Mosque
 Abderrahmane ibn Khaldoun Mosque
 Al-Baraka Mosque

Zawiyas

Zawiya Thaalibia in the Issers.
Zawiyet Sidi Amar Cherif in Sidi Daoud.
Zawiyet Sidi Boumerdassi in Tidjelabine.
Zawiyet Sidi Boushaki in Thenia.
 in Aafir.
 in Beni Amrane.
 in Khemis El-Khechna.
 in Boudouaou.

Education

 University of Boumerdès
 Faculty of Boudouaou
 Institut National de la Productivité et du Développement Industriel (INPED)
 Touzout brothers Lyceum
 Ahmed Rahmoune Lyceum
 Mohamed Bouchatal College
 Mohamed Boushaki School
 Draoui brothers Lyceum
 Emir Khaled Lyceum
 Mohamed Laïd Al-Khalifa Lyceum
 Frantz Fanon Lyceum

Health

Mohamed Bouyahiaoui Hospital

Boumerdès Orthopedic Emergency Hospital
Boumerdès Hospital

Tourism

Hotels

Albatros Beach Hotel
El Amir Hotel
La Villa Hotel
Le Rocher Hotel
Leïla Hotel
Medina Hotel
Soummam Hotel
Timezrit Hotel

Beaches

El Karma Beach
Nakhlat Beach
Miflah Beach
Echatt Beach
Corso Beach
Souanine Beach
Leghata Beach
Aafir Beach

Transport

Transport accidents

 2011 Boudouaou rail accident (August 22, 2011)

Ports

This province is home to the structures of several fishing ports:

Al-Qaous fishing shelter

Rivers

This province is crossed by dozens of rivers:
 
 
 
 
 
 
 
 
 
 
 Isser River
 
 
 
 
 
 
 Meraldene River
 
 
 Sebaou River

Dams

This province is home to the structures of several hydraulic dams:
 Keddara Dam
 Meraldene Dam

Sport

The municipalities of this province are home to several sports clubs, especially football, including:
 CMB Thénia
 IB Khemis El Khachna
 JS Bordj Ménaïel
 RC Boumerdes
 CR Issers
 ES Baghlia
 ESM Boudouaou
 JS Naciria
 US Dellys

Notable people

References

 
Provinces of Algeria
States and territories established in 1984